Bob Hamerton (28 April 1911 – 17 June 1990) was a Canadian swimmer. He competed in four events at the 1936 Summer Olympics.

In 1991, Hamerton was inducted into the Manitoba Sports Hall of Fame.

References

External links
 

1911 births
1990 deaths
Canadian male swimmers
Olympic swimmers of Canada
Swimmers at the 1936 Summer Olympics
Swimmers from Winnipeg
Manitoba Sports Hall of Fame inductees